Frank "Mick" Brough (8 October 1899 – 25 October 1960) was a New Zealand rower who won two medals at the 1930 British Empire Games.

Early life and family
Born in Dunedin on 8 October 1899, Brough was the son of William John Brough and Agnes Auchterlonie Brough (née Farquharson). On 26 March 1930, he married Elizabeth Marjorie Wylie at All Saints' Church in Dunedin.

Rowing
A member of the Otago Rowing Club, Brough was described as "powerfully muscled". He was selected in the New Zealand eight for the 1928 Olympic Games, but they did not travel because of insufficient funds. He represented New Zealand at the 1930 British Empire Games in Hamilton, Ontario, and was a member of the coxed four, which included Jack Macdonald, Ben Waters, Bert Sandos, and Arthur Eastwood (coxswain), that won the gold medal. He also stroked the eight that won the silver medal, three-quarters of a boat length behind the victorious English crew.

Death
Brough died in Dunedin on 25 October 1960, and his ashes were buried at Andersons Bay Cemetery.

References

External links
Photo of the New Zealand eight at the 1930 British Empire Games from the New Zealand Herald.

1899 births
1960 deaths
Sportspeople from Dunedin
New Zealand male rowers
Rowers at the 1930 British Empire Games
Commonwealth Games gold medallists for New Zealand
Commonwealth Games silver medallists for New Zealand
Commonwealth Games medallists in rowing
Medallists at the 1930 British Empire Games